Ronnie Lee Milsap (born Ronald Lee Millsaps; January 16, 1943) is an American country music singer and pianist. 

He was one of country music's most popular and influential performers of the 1970s and 1980s. Nearly completely blind from birth, he became one of the most successful and versatile country "crossover" singers of his time, appealing to both country and pop music markets with hit songs that incorporated pop, R&B, and rock and roll elements. His biggest crossover hits include "It Was Almost Like a Song", "Smoky Mountain Rain", "(There's) No Gettin' Over Me", "I Wouldn't Have Missed It for the World", "Any Day Now", and "Stranger in My House". He is credited with six Grammy Awards and 35 number-one country hits, third to George Strait and Conway Twitty. He was selected for induction into the Country Music Hall of Fame in 2014.

Career

Early life (1943–1971)
Milsap was born January 16, 1943, in Robbinsville, North Carolina. A congenital disorder left him almost completely blind from birth. Abandoned by his mother as an infant, he was raised in poverty by his grandparents in the Smoky Mountains until he was sent to the Governor Morehead School for the blind in Raleigh, North Carolina, at age 5.

During his childhood, Milsap developed a passion for music, particularly the late-night radio broadcasts of country music, gospel music, and rhythm and blues. When he was 7, his instructors noticed his musical talents. Soon afterward he began studying classical music formally at Governor Morehead and learned several instruments, eventually mastering the piano. When he was 14, a slap from one of the school's houseparents caused him to lose what very limited vision he had in his left eye.

With the national breakthrough of Elvis Presley in 1956, Milsap became interested in rock and roll music and formed a rock band called the Apparitions with fellow high-school students. In concert, Milsap has often paid tribute to the musicians of the 1950s who inspired him including Ray Charles, Little Richard, Jerry Lee Lewis, and Presley.

Milsap was awarded a full college scholarship and briefly attended Young Harris College in Young Harris, Georgia, with plans to become a lawyer. During this time, Milsap joined a popular local R&B band called the Dimensions that played gigs in the Atlanta area, and became a regular attraction at the rough and rowdy Royal Peacock Club. In the fall of 1964, Milsap declined a scholarship to law school and left college to pursue a full-time career in music. He met Joyce Reeves one night at a dinner party during this period, and the two were married in 1965.

In 1963, Milsap met Atlanta disc jockey Pat Hughes who became an early supporter of his music career. Milsap recorded his first single, "Total Disaster/It Went to Your Head", which enjoyed some local success in the Atlanta area. The single sold 15,000 copies with the help of Hughes, who played the record on his radio show. Around this same time, Milsap auditioned for a job as a keyboardist for musician J. J. Cale. In 1965, Milsap signed with New York-based Scepter Records, recording several obscure singles for the label over the next few years, and working briefly with other soul musicians like Ray Charles and Stevie Wonder.

Also in 1965, Milsap scored his first hit with the Ashford & Simpson-penned single, "Never Had It So Good", which peaked at No. 19 on the R&B chart in November of that year. It would be his only successful single during his time with Scepter. Milsap cut another Ashford & Simpson tune, "Let's Go Get Stoned", that was relegated to a B-side.

In the late 1960s, after moving to Memphis, Tennessee, Milsap worked for producer Chips Moman and became a popular weekly attraction at the Memphis nightclub T.J.'s. During this time, Moman helped Milsap land work as a session musician on numerous projects including several recordings with Elvis Presley such as "Don't Cry Daddy" in 1969 and "Kentucky Rain" in 1970. That same year, Milsap made the lower reaches of the pop charts with the single "Loving You Is a Natural Thing". He recorded and released his debut album, Ronnie Milsap, on Warner Brothers in 1971.

Breakthrough success (1973–1975)
In December 1972, Milsap relocated to Nashville after a chance meeting with country music star Charley Pride who was in the audience for a Milsap gig at the nightclub Whiskey A-Go-Go on Sunset Blvd. in Los Angeles. Pride was impressed with Milsap's singing and encouraged him to change course and focus on country music. Milsap began working with Pride's manager, Jack D. Johnson, and was signed to RCA Records in 1973. He released his first single for RCA that year, "I Hate You", which became his first country music success, peaking at No. 10 on the country chart. In 1974, Milsap toured with Pride as an opening act and had two No. 1 singles: "Pure Love" (written by Eddie Rabbitt) and the Kris Kristofferson composition "Please Don't Tell Me How the Story Ends" which won Milsap his first Grammy. In 1975, he revived the Don Gibson song "(I'd Be) A Legend in My Time" and scored another No. 1 hit with "Daydreams About Night Things".

"It Was Almost Like a Song" (1976–1978)
From 1976 to 1978, Milsap became one of country music's biggest stars. He scored seven No. 1 singles in a row, including the Grammy-winning "(I'm a) Stand by My Woman Man" and "What a Difference You've Made in My Life". The most significant of this series was "It Was Almost Like a Song" in 1977, a piano-based ballad, which became his most successful single of the 1970s. In addition to topping the Billboard Hot Country Songs chart, the song was his first entry on the Billboard Hot 100 pop music chart since "Please Don't Tell Me How the Story Ends" reached No. 95; "It Was Almost Like a Song," reached No. 16. It was also his first song to make the Adult Contemporary Chart, stopping at No. 7. While the song was Milsap's only crossover success of the 1970s, he continued to achieve hits on the country music charts for the remainder of the decade.

Crossover success (1979–1992)
Milsap's sound shifted toward string-laden pop ballads during the late 1970s which resulted in crossover success on the pop charts beginning in the early 1980s. From 1980 until 1983, he scored a series of eleven No. 1 singles. Milsap's Greatest Hits album, released in 1980, included a new single, "Smoky Mountain Rain", which became a No. 1 smash on the country charts. The single peaked in the Top 20 on the pop music chart and also became the first of two Milsap songs to score No. 1 on the Adult Contemporary chart.

Other crossover successes included the Top 5 pop single, "(There's) No Gettin' Over Me", and two Top 20 songs in "I Wouldn't Have Missed It For the World" and "Any Day Now", the latter which lasted five weeks at No. 1 on Billboards Adult Contemporary chart. He also had some success with "He Got You". All four songs reached No. 1 on the country music charts.

Although the series of No. 1 hits ended in 1983, the last song of the series, "Stranger in My House", was still successful on all three charts, peaking at No. 5 on the country music chart, No. 23 on the pop music chart, and No. 8 on the Adult Contemporary chart. Just a few months later, "Don't You Know How Much I Love You" was released, becoming Milsap's last significant entry on the pop music chart, stopping at No. 58. However it, along with others, still became major successes on the Adult Contemporary chart. These successful singles include "Show Her", "Still Losing You", and finally, the Grammy-winning song "Lost in the Fifties Tonight" (his last pop crossover success) in 1985.

Between 1985 and 1987, Milsap enjoyed a series of uninterrupted No. 1  country singles, enjoying great success at this time with "She Keeps the Home Fires Burning", "In Love", "Snap Your Fingers", "Where Do the Nights Go", and the Grammy-winning duet with Kenny Rogers, "Make No Mistake, She's Mine".

In 1989, Milsap had his last No. 1 song with "A Woman in Love", although he still remained successful on the charts. Other Top 10 singles between 1989 and 1991 include "Houston Solution", "Stranger Things Have Happened", "Turn That Radio On", a remake of the 1950s hit "Since I Don't Have You" (his last adult contemporary hit) and "Are You Loving Me Like I'm loving You". With the help of writer Tom Carter, Milsap wrote and released his autobiography, titled Almost like a Song, in 1990.

In 1992, he had a major success with "All Is Fair in Love and War". The song featured rock guitarist Mark Knopfler on lead guitar and peaked at No. 11; his last top-40 country hit, "True Believer," peaked in 1993 at No. 30. By that time, however, Milsap's chart success began to decline.

1993–present: Life today

Milsap has remained one of country music's best-loved and most successful artists despite the lack of radio airplay since the mid-1990s. In 1993, he left RCA for Liberty and released the album True Believer which failed to achieve significant radio airplay, although the title song scored No. 30 on the country chart. In 2000, Milsap resurfaced with a two-CD set, 40 No. 1 Hits, featuring a new single entitled "Time, Love, and Money". The new collection earned a gold record although the single failed to score on the charts.

In 2000, Milsap's biography was featured by A&E Networks's Biography television series. Milsap has also been featured by CMT's numerous shows, including 40 Greatest Men of Country Music and a 2005 episode of Crossroads with Tex-Mex rock group Los Lonely Boys.

During 2004, Milsap worked with producer Jerry F. Sharell to record his first non-country album since the early 1970s, Just for a Thrill. The project was a collection of American popular/jazz music standards which earned Milsap a Grammy award nomination that year. In 2006, Milsap signed with his former company RCA and returned to a mainstream, contemporary country music style with the album My Life. The first single was "Local Girls" which reached No. 54.

In 2009, Milsap released a two-CD set entitled Then Sings My Soul which featured 24 hymns and gospel songs, including "Up To Zion". "Up To Zion" was co-written by Gregory James Tornquist and Noreen Crayton and became a No. 1 hit on the southern gospel charts. On May 12, 2010, he was part of a Gaither Video Taping.

Milsap's studio album Country Again was released in July 2011. The album was a return to a more traditional country sound.

On May 2, 2013, Milsap performed at the memorial service of country legend George Jones, singing the Jones classic "When the Grass Grows Over Me". The service was broadcast live on CMT, GAC, RFD-TV, The Nashville Network, and Family Net as well as Nashville stations. SiriusXM and WSM 650AM, home of the Grand Ole Opry, broadcast the event on radio.

On December 27, 2013, it was announced that Milsap would release a new album. Summer #17 was released in March 2014. The album features new recordings of classic pop and R&B songs from the 1950s and 60's.

On June 1, 2014, Rolling Stone magazine ranked "Smoky Mountain Rain" #96 in their list of the 100 greatest country songs.

In 2016, Milsap was selected as one of 30 artists to perform on "Forever Country", a mash-up track of "Take Me Home, Country Roads", "On the Road Again" and "I Will Always Love You" which celebrates 50 years of the CMA Awards.

In October 2018, Billboard announced that Milsap would release a duets album, titled Ronnie Milsap: The Duets in January 2019. The album was released on January 18, 2019.

Milsap released the album A Better Word for Love in 2021, recorded at Ronnie's Place and released by Black River Entertainment.

Amateur radio operator
Milsap is an Advanced-class amateur radio operator. His call sign is WB4KCG.

Personal life
In 1965, Milsap married Joyce Reeves. They had one son, Ronald Todd Milsap, who was found dead on February 23, 2019, on his houseboat from an apparent medical condition. Ronald Todd's son, who had not heard from his father for the past two days, found the body. Ronald Todd was 49. Joyce Reeves Milsap died on September 6, 2021. She had been battling leukemia since 2014. She was 81-years old.

Discography

Industry awards and honors
Academy of Country Music
1982 Top Male Vocalist
1985 Song of the Year – "Lost in the Fifties Tonight"
1988 Instrumentalist of the Year, Keyboards
2002 Pioneer Award

Billboard
1980 No. 1 Country Song of the Year – "My Heart"
1985 No. 1 Country Song of the Year – "Lost in the Fifties Tonight"

Country Music Association
1974 Male Vocalist of the Year
1975 Album of the Year – "A Legend in My Time"
1976 Male Vocalist of the Year
1977 Album of the Year – "Ronnie Milsap Live"
1977 Entertainer of the Year
1977 Male Vocalist of the Year
1978 Album of the Year – "It Was Almost Like a Song"
1986 Album of the Year – "Lost in the Fifties Tonight
Country Music Hall of Fame 2014 Inductee

Grammy awards
1975 Best Male Country Vocal Performance – "Please Don't Tell Me How The Story Ends"
1977 Best Male Country Vocal Performance – "(I'm a) Stand by My Woman Man"
1982 Best Male Country Vocal Performance – "(There's) No Gettin' Over Me"
1986 Best Male Country Vocal Performance – "Lost in the Fifties Tonight"
1987 Best Male Country Vocal Performance – "Lost in the Fifties Tonight"
1988 Best Country Collaboration with Vocals – "Make No Mistake, She's Mine" (w/ Kenny Rogers)

Music City News Country
1975 Most Promising Male Artist

Miscellaneous achievements
40 No. 1 hits, 35 of which reached the top spot on the Billboard chart; the remaining 5 topped other trade charts, including Cashbox
Over 35 million albums sold
Inducted into the Grand Ole Opry in 1976
Inducted into the North Carolina Music Hall of Fame in 2002
Awarded the Career Achievement Award by Country Radio Seminar in 2006
Awarded the 2007 Rocketown Legend Award

Other honors
On December 2, 2020, six miles of U.S. 129 in Graham County, North Carolina, from Yellow Creek near Robbinsville to the Swain County line, was designated Ronnie Milsap Highway.

Bibliography

See also
List of best selling music artists

References

External links

Amateur radio people
American country keyboardists
American country pianists
American male pianists
American country singer-songwriters
American male singer-songwriters
Blind musicians
Country Music Hall of Fame inductees
Living people
Country musicians from North Carolina
People from Robbinsville, North Carolina
Grammy Award winners
Grand Ole Opry members
Young Harris College alumni
1943 births
RCA Records Nashville artists
American blind people
Musicians from Appalachia
20th-century American pianists
21st-century American keyboardists
21st-century American pianists
20th-century American male musicians
21st-century American male musicians
20th-century American keyboardists
Singer-songwriters from North Carolina